Zephaniah 1 is the first chapter of the Book of Zephaniah in the Hebrew Bible or the Old Testament of the Christian Bible. This book contains the prophecies attributed to the prophet Zephaniah, and is a part of the Book of the Twelve Minor Prophets. This chapter contains a call to penitence and oracles against nations, the editorial superscription and the exposition about the day of Yahweh's judgment against the Kingdom of Judah and Jerusalem.

Text
The original text was written in Hebrew language. This chapter is divided into 18 verses.

Textual witnesses
Some early manuscripts containing the text of this chapter in Hebrew are of the Masoretic Text tradition, which includes the Codex Cairensis (895), the Petersburg Codex of the Prophets (916), Aleppo Codex (10th century), Codex Leningradensis (1008). Fragments containing parts of this chapter in Hebrew were found among the Dead Sea Scrolls, including  4Q77 (4QXIIb; 150–125 BCE) with extant verses 1–2, 18; and Wadi Murabba'at Minor Prophets (Mur88; MurXIIProph; 75-100 CE) with extant verses 1, 11–18.

There is also a translation into Koine Greek known as the Septuagint, made in the last few centuries BC. Extant ancient manuscripts of the Septuagint version include Codex Vaticanus (B; B; 4th century), Codex Sinaiticus (S; BHK: S; 4th century), Codex Alexandrinus (A; A; 5th century) and Codex Marchalianus (Q; Q; 6th century). Some fragments containing parts of this chapter (a revision of the Septuagint) were found among the Dead Sea Scrolls, i.e., Naḥal Ḥever (8ḤevXIIgr; 1st century CE) with extant verses 1-6, 13-18

Sub-Divisions
NKJV groups this chapter:
  = Title
  = The Great Day of the Lord

Editorial Superscription (1:1)
The superscription or title of the book places Zephaniah's ministry during the reign of King Josiah of Judah, and based on the content of his attacks against the religious syncretism of Judah, probably was active before Josiah's reform in 621 BCE.

Verse 1
The word of the Lord which came to Zephaniah the son of Cushi, the son of Gedaliah, the son of Amariah, the son of Hezekiah, in the days of Josiah the son of Amon, king of Judah.
Cross reference: Ezra 2:2; Ezra 4:24; Ezra 5:1-3; Ezra 6:1; 
The name "Zephaniah" means "Jehovah hath guarded," literally, "hidden".
"Hezekiah", consisting of the same letters with Hezekiah, king of Judah, and refers to that king, according to some scholars, including Jewish rabbi Aben Ezra. 
"In the days of Josiah": refers to a period between 642 and 609 BC of Josiah's reign in Judah,

The Day of Yahweh's Judgment against Judah and Jerusalem (1:2–18)

Verse 14

The great day of the Lord is near;
It is near and hastens quickly.
The noise of the day of the Lord is bitter;
There the mighty men shall cry out.
"Day of the Lord": the verses 14–16 becomes the basis of 'Dies Irae', a medieval hymn about the day of the Yahweh as a day of darkness and defeat, in the tradition of the Book of Amos and Isaiah.
"Noise" (or "voice") of the day of the Lord" refers to the day when Jehovah is ushering with a "roar of vengeance against the guilty" (Amos 1:2).

See also
Baal
Amon, king of Judah
Hezekiah
Jerusalem
Josiah, king of Judah
Milcom
Zephaniah

References

Sources

External links 

Jewish translations:
 Zephaniah (Judaica Press) translation with Rashi's commentary at Chabad.org
Christian translations:
Online Bible at GospelHall.org (ESV, KJV, Darby, American Standard Version, Bible in Basic English)
  Various versions

01